Johan Camitz (June 29, 1962 – August 10, 2000) was a Swedish director of music videos and advertisements.

Biography

Camitz studied law and worked for several years as a sculptor. He eventually was given the opportunity for a Diesel commercial. He later worked for Propaganda Films and shot commercials for Volkswagen, Diesel, and Nike. For his advertising work, he won a silver D&AD award, two gold Clio Awards, and three gold and a silver award at Cannes Lions International Advertising Festival.  Among other notable music video collaborations, Camitz directed the Spice Girls first music video for their hit single "Wannabe".

In August 2000, after a night out with friends and colleagues in Manhattan, Camitz was crossing the street on his way to his apartment in Soho when he was hit by a SUV, resulting in his death at St. Vincent's Hospital Medical Center several hours later. The driver of the vehicle had been shot in a gang-related incident and was attempting to flee his attackers, but he was unable to maintain control of his vehicle and drove up on the sidewalk, striking and killing Camitz. The driver was reported dead at the scene from his gunshot wounds.

Advertising
1995 – Diesel
1998 – Nike (Cannes Advertising Film Awards)
1999 – Volkswagen (ANDY award)

Music videos
1996 – "Wannabe" by Spice Girls
1997 – "Save Tonight" by Eagle-Eye Cherry

References

External links
 

Artists from Stockholm
Advertising directors
Swedish music video directors
1960s births
2000 deaths